Transmembrane protein 165 is a protein that in humans is encoded by the TMEM165 gene.

Model organisms

Model organisms have been used in the study of TMEM165 function. A conditional knockout mouse line, called Tmem165tm1e(EUCOMM)Wtsi was generated as part of the International Knockout Mouse Consortium program — a high-throughput mutagenesis project to generate and distribute animal models of disease to interested scientists.

Male and female animals underwent a standardized phenotypic screen to determine the effects of deletion. Twenty three tests were carried out on mutant mice and two significant abnormalities were observed. Homozygous mutant males had skeletal deformities, including scoliosis, and an increased susceptibility to bacterial infection.

References

Further reading 
 

Human proteins
Genes mutated in mice